William Hambly Stoneman III (born April 7, 1944) is an American former professional baseball player and executive who, during his eight-year (–) pitching career in Major League Baseball, threw two no-hitters; then, as general manager of the Anaheim Angels (–), presided over the franchise's first-ever World Series championship in 2002.

Stoneman was born in Oak Park, Illinois, and graduated from West Covina High School in Southern California in 1962.

Amateur career
A right-handed pitcher, Stoneman spent a year at Mt. San Antonio College in Walnut, then transferred to the University of Idaho to play college baseball for the Idaho Vandals, and helped the Vandals win the inaugural Big Sky title in 1964 as a sophomore. When Stoneman was a junior, the Vandals were 17–13 and he was 5–3 with a 1.80 earned run average (ERA) and averaged 1.5 strikeouts per inning.

As a senior in 1966, Stoneman was 6–2 with a 0.45 ERA in the regular season, and the Vandals won the Big Sky again with a  record in the regular season. Invited to the NCAA playoffs for the first time, Idaho eliminated Colorado State College (now Northern Colorado) and Air Force on the road in Greeley, Colorado. The Vandals were one step from the College World Series in Omaha, but lost to Arizona in Tucson in the District 7 finals, today's "Super-Regionals" (Sweet 16). Idaho ended their best-ever season at 

Stoneman received his bachelor's degree from the University of Idaho in 1966, and a master's degree from the University of Oklahoma. While at Idaho, he was an active member of Beta Theta Pi fraternity.

Professional career
The Chicago Cubs selected Stoneman in the 31st round of the 1966 Major League Baseball draft with the 595th overall selection. After signing, Stoneman pitched at three minor-league classifications in 1966, with Rookie-level Caldwell, Single-A Lodi, and Double-A Dallas-Fort Worth. He started 1967 in Double-A and, after five games pitched, moved to Triple-A Tacoma. 

The Cubs called up Stoneman to the major leagues in mid-season of 1967. He debuted as a starting pitcher with back-to-back assignments against the San Francisco Giants on July 16 and 21, allowing three total runs in 9 innings but gaining no decisions, although the Cubs won both games. Manager Leo Durocher then shifted Stoneman to the bullpen, where he made 26 appearances as a relief pitcher. He ended his rookie MLB campaign with a 3.29 earned run average, four saves and 52 strikeouts in 63 innings pitched.

In the expansion draft of October 1968, Stoneman was selected by the Montreal Expos, where he spent five seasons and became a full-time starter for manager Gene Mauch. He threw his two no-hitters with the Expos: the first against the Philadelphia Phillies at Connie Mack Stadium on April 17, 1969. It was Stoneman's fifth major league start and only the ninth game of the franchise's existence; he had eight strikeouts and five walks. The second came at the end of the 1972 season on October 2, when he defeated the New York Mets in Montreal at Jarry Park, caught by Tim McCarver. The latter was the first major league no-hitter in Canada, and both were 7–0 scores. The second included nine strikeouts and seven walks. Stoneman also threw a one-hitter at home in 1971 against the San Diego Padres, a well-attended 2–0 win on Helmet Night on Wednesday, June 16. In perhaps the best outing of his career, Stoneman struck out 14 and allowed just one base on balls. The only hit came with one out in the seventh inning, a clean single to right field off the bat of Cito Gaston, which was the Padres' only well-struck ball of the night. He was named to the National League All-Star Team in 1972 
and pitched two innings in relief with two strikeouts.

He struck out 251 in 295 innings in 1971, with a 17–16 record and a 3.15 ERA for non-contending Montreal(71–90). That season, Stoneman also finished third in strikeouts in the National League, behind Tom Seaver (289) and Ferguson Jenkins (263), and his 39 starts tied for the league-high with Jenkins. He also had 20 complete games in 1971, tied for third with Bob Gibson. His career was shortened by an arm injury in 1973: his earned run average ballooned from 2.98 in 1972 to 6.80 (1973), then 6.10 (1974), for a record of only 5–16 in that span.

Overall, Stoneman won 54 games and lost 85, with an ERA of 4.08 in 245 appearances. For his career he had 169 starts, 45 complete games, and 934 strikeouts in 1,236 innings.

As a batter, Stoneman holds the record with most consecutive games played with at least one strikeout. From April 30, 1971, to April 21, 1972, Stoneman played in 37 consecutive games with at least one strikeout in an at bat. He was left in to bat in the 1972 All-Star Game against Gaylord Perry, where, he struck out in the bottom of the seventh inning. In 338 regular season at bats, Stoneman struck out 212 times and compiled a career batting average of .086 with 25 singles, 4 extra-base hits (all doubles), and 23 walks. Despite that strikeout streak, his best season batting average was .129 in 1971. The strikeout streak record was tied by New York Yankees outfielder Aaron Judge in 2017.

Front office career
After his playing career ended, Stoneman worked in banking in Canada, then joined the Montreal Expos' front office in November 1983, starting out in player relations. He became the team's vice president of business operations in September 1984, and later served as the club's general manager in 1987 and 1988. 

Returning to Southern California, Stoneman became general manager of the Angels after the  season. He hired Mike Scioscia as the club's manager and presided over its  American League title and World Series championship — the first pennant and World Series championship in the club's 42-year history to that point. He remained in office through the Angels' ownership transition from the Walt Disney Company to Arturo Moreno. Stoneman stepped down as GM following the 2007 season.

On July 1, 2015, Angels general manager Jerry DiPoto resigned following a power struggle with manager Mike Scioscia. Stoneman was brought in as interim GM while the team looked for a full-time replacement. Billy Eppler was hired as the full-time replacement on October 4, 2015.

See also

 List of Major League Baseball no-hitters

References

External links

Baseball America, Executive Database
University of Idaho Athletics – Hall of Fame – Bill Stoneman
Gem of the Mountains, 1966 University of Idaho yearbook – 1966 baseball season

 

1944 births
Living people
Baseball players from Illinois
American expatriate baseball players in Canada
National League All-Stars
California Angels players
Anaheim Angels executives
Dallas–Fort Worth Spurs players
Lodi Crushers players
Los Angeles Angels of Anaheim executives
Chicago Cubs players
Montreal Expos executives
Montreal Expos players
Major League Baseball pitchers
Major League Baseball general managers
Idaho Vandals baseball players
Sportspeople from Oak Park, Illinois
Tacoma Cubs players
University of Oklahoma alumni
People from West Covina, California